This is a list of 2014–15 Dutch Basketball League (DBL) transactions . Moves made during the 2014 offseason till the end of the season are included. Contract extensions and retiring players are not included.
Only players on the move are included.

References

Dutch Basketball League transactions